Club Deportivo Guastatoya is a Guatemalan football club based in Guastatoya, El Progreso Department. They compete in the Liga Nacional, the top tier of Guatemalan football.

History
The team had its origins under the name of Guastatoya Futbol Club, which was founded in 1990, however, the club was refounded as C.D. Guastatoya in 2005 in the city of Guastatoya in the Department of El Progreso. They have been in the Guatemalan First Division and in the amateur leagues of the country, that until in the 2013/14 season they managed to ascend to the Liga Nacional for the first time in its history, despite not being the champion of the Guatemalan First Division. They have a rivalry with Sanarate.

Stadium
They play at the Estadio David Cordón  Hichos, which holds a capacity of 3,100.

Honours

 Liga Nacional de Guatemala and predecessors 
 Champions (3): Clausura 2018, Apertura 2018, Apertura 2020
 Campeón de Campeones
 Champions (1): 2019

Performance in international competitions
CONCACAF Champions League
2019 - Round of 16
CONCACAF League
2019 - Round of 16
CONCACAF League
2021 - Semifinals 
CONCACAF Champions League
2022 - Round of 16

Current squad
As of 7 February 2023:

Managerial history
Guastatoya has had 8 permanent managers since it first appointed Uruguayan Ariel Sena coach in 2010. The longest serving manager was Ariel Sena, who managed Guastatoya for five years from 2010 to December 2015. Ariel Sena won the club's first title, winning the Segunda División title in 2011, while Amarini Villatoro won the club's first Liga Nacional title in Apertura 2018 and their second Liga Nacional title in Clausura 2018. They then won their third Apertura title under Willy Coito Olivera in February 2021.

 Ariel Sena (2010–2015)
 Francisco Melgar (2015–2016)
 Roque Alfaro (2016)
 Amarini Villatoro (2016–2019)
 Fabricio Benitez (2019–2020)
 Willy Coito Olivera (2020–2021)
 Rafael Díaz (2021)
 Daniel Guzmán (2021)
 Mario Acevedo (2021- )

References

3.

Football clubs in Guatemala